The Beinamar Faunal Reserve covers an area of 7650 km2. It was proposed to be set up by the local people in view of its rare wildlife species.

References

Faunal reserves
Protected areas of Chad